Ebro is a town in Washington County, Florida, United States. The population was 270 at the 2010 census. As of 2018, the population recorded by the U.S. Census Bureau is 275.

It is believed that the Spanish named the town, as there is an Ebro River in Spain.

Geography

Ebro is located in the southwestern part of Washington County at  (30.443152, –85.880790). It is the closest municipality to Northwest Florida Beaches International Airport.

Florida State Roads 20 and 79 are the main roads through the town. FL-79 runs from north to south to the east of the town, leading north  to Bonifay along Interstate 10 and south  to U.S. Route 98 near Panama City Beach. FL-20 runs from west to east through the center of town, leading east  to Blountstown and west  to Freeport.

Demographics

As of the census of 2000, there were 250 people, 102 households, and 63 families residing in the town. The racial makeup of the town was 73.60% White, 3.60% African American, 6.40% Native American, 0.40% Pacific Islander, 0.40% from other races, and 15.60% from two or more races. Hispanic or Latino of any race were 4.40% of the population.

There were 102 households, out of which 33.3% had children under the age of 18 living with them, 47.1% were married couples living together, 10.8% had a female householder with no husband present, and 38.2% were non-families. 32.4% of all households were made up of individuals, and 9.8% had someone living alone who was 65 years of age or older. The average household size was 2.45 and the average family size was 3.10.

In the town, the population was spread out, with 23.2% under the age of 18, 12.0% from 18 to 24, 29.2% from 25 to 44, 27.6% from 45 to 64, and 8.0% who were 65 years of age or older. The median age was 36 years. For every 100 females, there were 98.4 males. For every 100 females age 18 and over, there were 102.1 males.

The median income for a household in the town was $28,750, and the median income for a family was $40,833. Males had a median income of $33,333 versus $25,208 for females. The per capita income for the town was $14,504. About 20.6% of families and 21.0% of the population were below the poverty line, including 22.6% of those under the age of eighteen and 25.0% of those 65 or over.

Images

References

Towns in Washington County, Florida
Towns in Florida